Richie Murray (born 1982 in Ballinasloe) is an Irish sportsperson. He plays hurling with his local club St Thomas's and with the Galway senior inter-county team. He has won 2 All-Ireland minor hurling medals with Galway, captaining the winning team in 2000.

References
 Richie Murray on Hurlingstats.com (archived)
 Galway GAA honours

1982 births
Living people
St Thomas's hurlers
Galway inter-county hurlers
People from Ballinasloe